N-acetyltransferase ESCO2, also known as establishment of cohesion 1 homolog 2 or ECO1 homolog 2, is an enzyme that in humans is encoded by the ESCO2 gene.

Function 

This gene encodes a protein that may have acetyltransferase activity and may be required for the establishment of sister chromatid cohesion during the S phase of the cell cycle.

Clinical significance 

Mutations in the ESCO2 gene are associated with Roberts syndrome.

See also
 Cohesin#Clinical significance
 Establishment of sister chromatid cohesion

References

Further reading

</ref>

External links

  GeneReviews/NIH/NCBI/UW entry on Roberts Syndrome